Dow Dangeh (also Romanized as Dow Dāngeh, Do Dāngeh, and Dū Dāngeh; also known as Dongīyeh and Dūngiyeh) is a village in Darreh Seydi Rural District, in the Central District of Borujerd County, Lorestan Province, Iran. At the 2006 census, its population was 487, in 111 families.

References 

Towns and villages in Borujerd County